The Coupe du Monde Cycliste Féminine de Montréal (or simply Montreal World Cup) was an elite women's professional road bicycle racing event held annually between 1998 and 2009 in Montréal, Quebec, Canada as part of the UCI Women's Road Cycling World Cup season.

Past winners

External links
 Official site

UCI Women's Road World Cup
Sports competitions in Montreal
Cycle races in Canada
Recurring sporting events established in 1998
Recurring sporting events disestablished in 2009
Defunct cycling races in Canada
1998 establishments in Quebec
2009 disestablishments in Quebec
Women in Montreal